Aldisa expleta is a species of sea slug, a dorid nudibranch, a marine gastropod mollusk in the family Cadlinidae.

Distribution
The marine species occurs off the Canary Islands.

References

Cadlinidae
Gastropods described in 1982